Griswold is a city in Cass County, Iowa, United States. The population was 994 at the time of the 2020 census.

History
The town was named for J. N. A. Griswold, a railroad director.

Geography
Griswold is located at  (41.2354, -95.1406).

Demographics

2010 census
As of the census of 2010, there were 1,036 people, 445 households, and 278 families living in the city. The racial makeup of the city was 97.5% White, 1.0% African American, 0.3% Native American, 0.1% Asian, 0.3% from other races, and 0.9% from two or more races. Hispanic or Latino of any race were 1.1% of the population.

There were 445 households, of which 27.9% had children under the age of 18 living with them, 50.1% were married couples living together, 8.3% had a female householder with no husband present, 4.0% had a male householder with no wife present, and 37.5% were non-families. 33.0% of all households were made up of individuals, and 17.7% had someone living alone who was 65 years of age or older. The average household size was 2.25 and the average family size was 2.85.

The median age in the city was 44.9 years. 23.7% of residents were under the age of 18; 5.7% were between the ages of 18 and 24; 20.8% were from 25 to 44; 25.2% were from 45 to 64; and 24.7% were 65 years of age or older. The gender makeup of the city was 45.7% male and 54.3% female.

2000 census
As of the census of 2000, there were 1,039 people, 440 households, and 282 families living in the city. The racial makeup of the city was 99.04% White, 0.19% Native American, 0.10% Pacific Islander, 0.38% from other races, and 0.29% from two or more races. Hispanic or Latino of any race were 1.35% of the population.

There were 440 households, out of which 25.7% had children under the age of 18 living with them, 54.3% were married couples living together, 6.1% had a female householder with no husband present, and 35.9% were non-families. 31.4% of all households were made up of individuals, and 18.6% had someone living alone who was 65 years of age or older. The average household size was 2.24 and the average family size was 2.82.

21.6% are under the age of 18, 5.6% from 18 to 24, 23.5% from 25 to 44, 21.8% from 45 to 64, and 27.5% who were 65 years of age or older. The median age was 45 years. For every 100 females, there were 86.5 males. For every 100 females age 18 and over, there were 85.2 males.

The median income for a household in the city was $31,538, and the median income for a family was $38,125. Males had a median income of $27,667 versus $18,542 for females. The per capita income for the city was $16,430. About 5.5% of families and 6.6% of the population were below the poverty line, including 8.2% of those under age 18 and 9.4% of those age 65 or over.

Education
The Griswold Community School District operates area public schools.

Notable people

Neville Brand — television and movie actor
Guy Lowman - college basketball, football and baseball coach

References

External links

 
City of Griswold
City-Data Comprehensive statistical data and more about Griswold

Cities in Cass County, Iowa
Cities in Iowa